Energy Transition Minerals Ltd (formerly Greenland Minerals Limited, ASX Code: GGG) is an ASX-listed company focused on the exploration, development and financing of minerals that are critical to a low carbon future. The company’s current projects include the Kvanefjeld, located in Greenland, and Villasrubias, located in Spain.

Kvanefjeld project 
The Kvanefjeld project is located near the southwest of Greenland consisting of multi-element deposit including rare-earth elements (REE), zinc, and uranium, within marginal phases of the ilimaussaq intrusive complex. As at February 2015, the project has defined a total resource of 673 Mt @ 10,900 ppm TREO, 248 ppm U3O8, 10,000 ppm REO, 881 ppm Y2O3, 2,270 ppm Zn which contained 7.34 Mt TREO, 368 Mlbs U3O8, 1.53 Mt Zn using 150 ppm U3O8 cut-off. The project shows higher grade portions located close to the ground surface. GGG aims to produce light and heavy RE concentrates, zinc concentrate, uranium concentrate, large-scale output, and long life of mine in the project area.

2021 Greenlandic general election 
The company's plans became a significant political issue in the 2021 Greenlandic general election. The Inuit Ataqatigiit party called for a moratorium on uranium mining, putting into question the wider rare earth mining project, whilst the Siumut party voiced support, citing economic growth as a key reason. In a survey to determine the public opinion on mining in the Kvanefjeld deposit, 63% opposed such activity, of which 45% were very much against.

Villarubias Project 
The Villarubias project is located in the southwest corner of the province of Salamanca close to the Portuguese border and 33 km away from Ciudad Rodrigo, the district capital. The project consists of a permit of investigation (11.4 km2) acquired by Technology Metals Europe SL in 2021. The main target is a set of lithium-tantalum-niobium-tin-bearing aplite-pegmatite dykes. Of these minerals, the first three are critical raw materials for the EU, according to the list updated in 2020.

Chinese shareholding 
In 2016, a Chinese company, Shenghe Resources Holding Co Ltd became the largest shareholder in Greenland Minerals Limited with a 11% share.

References

External links
 

Mining companies of Australia
Mining in Greenland
Companies listed on the Australian Securities Exchange